Ventoso is a village (curazia) in central San Marino. It belongs to the castle of Borgo Maggiore. Its name means, in Italian language, windy.

History
The village was an Ancient Roman castrum, known as Castrum Ventosi. It knew a rapid growing in the last decade of the 20th century.

Geography
Ventoso is located in north of its municipality, very close to the borders to Acquaviva and to the Italian municipality of Verucchio. The village is linked with the Italian town by a road from Borgo Maggiore. Its main street is named Decima Gualdaria.

See also
Borgo Maggiore
Cà Melone
Cà Rigo
Cailungo
San Giovanni sotto le Penne
Valdragone

Curazie in San Marino
Italy–San Marino border crossings
Borgo Maggiore